The John F. Slater House, also known as the Elks Club, is a historic building in Norwich, Connecticut. 

It was built in brick for John Fox Slater around either 1827 or 1843. It was added to the National Register of Historic Places in 1985 as part of the Downtown Norwich Historic District as "the most elaborate Greek Revival building in the downtown", and it is fronted by a monumental Corinthian portico. The design of the house has been attributed to John Bishop, a builder from New London who was responsible for the Huntington Street Baptist Church. The house was later owned by the local lodge of Elks, who used the building as their clubhouse. In 1914-15 they built a large but complementary rear addition, designed by architects Cudworth & Woodworth and contractors Doyle & Murphy, the same team that would build the Willimantic Elks Club ten years later.

The building was vacant as of January 2014.

See also
Slater Memorial Museum

References

Houses in Norwich, Connecticut
Clubhouses in Connecticut
Elks buildings
Greek Revival houses in Connecticut
Historic district contributing properties in Connecticut
National Register of Historic Places in New London County, Connecticut